Aliya Sitdikova (born 1976) is a Russian orienteering competitor.

She won a silver medal at the World Games in 2005 in the mixed relay, with Sergey Detkov, Maxim Davydov and Tatiana Ryabkina.

References

External links
 

1976 births
Living people
Russian orienteers
Foot orienteers
Female orienteers
World Games silver medalists

Competitors at the 2005 World Games
World Games medalists in orienteering